Goneh Gorgi (also Romanized as Goneh Gorgī) is a hamlet in Deh Bakri Rural District, in the Central District of Bam County, Kerman Province, Iran. At the 2006 census, its population was 28, in 5 families.

References 

Populated places in Bam County